Mugani Désiré, known professionally as Big Fizzo, is a Burundian singer.

Early life 
Big Fizzo was born in Makamba  and raised in Bujumbura, Burundi.

Career 
Big Fizzo begun his music career in the 1990s, he worked with Kidumu and after in a band, nigga soul. He is popular in Rwanda and Burundi sung both in Kinyarwanda language and Kirundi

He has released songs such as ‘Leave me alone’, ‘Bajou’ and ‘Sitapenda Tena’.

References

Living people
Year of birth missing (living people)
Burundian male singers
People from Bujumbura